The Adidas Tango 12 was the official match association football of the  UEFA Euro 2012, with variants being used for the 2012 Summer Olympics. The ball is named after the original and successful Adidas Tango family of footballs from the late 1970s, but the construction of the Tango 12 is completely different.  Variations of the ball have been used in other contemporary competitions including the Africa Cup of Nations and the Summer Olympics – Adidas has not categorised these football as the "Adidas Tango 12" family, however they are listed here due to their similar design.

The ball was officially presented on 2 December 2011, during the group draw for the final tournament in Kyiv. UEFA count the Tango 12 as the fourth incarnation of the ball although there have been other variations made in-between, The ball is reportedly designed to be easier to dribble and control than its predecessor the Adidas Jabulani (used during the 2010 FIFA World Cup in South Africa).  Tango 12 uses a construction design based on the Adidas Jabulani but heavily modified, thirty-two 2D panels instead of eight 3D panels.

The Adidas Tango 12 features a modern interpretation of the design including a coloured outline inspired by the flags of the two host nations – Poland and Ukraine. Etched into the Tango design are three bespoke graphics which celebrate the decorative art of paper cutting, a tradition in the rural areas of both host countries which the designers say creates a link to the key characteristics of football – unity, rivalry and passion.

Versions

The Tango variation for the 2011 UEFA Super Cup, the 2011–12 UEFA Europa League as well as the Torfabrik for the 2011–12 Bundesliga, use an older triangular grip texture instead of the newer, granular surface found on the Tango 12. Their construction is the same as the Tango 12; however, their appearance is similar to the Jabulani (excluding the UEFA Super Cup ball that applies respective colours and design).

Torfabrik
Torfabrik (English: "Goal factory") has been the Adidas ball for the Bundesliga since the 2011–12 season. This replaced the 2010–11 season's Jabulani Torfabrik, based on the older Jabulani.

Adidas Cafusa

For the 2013 FIFA Confederations Cup, Adidas produced the Cafusa. The ball used the same technology and materials as the Tango 12 (and Torfabrik) although with a different design.

Cafusa was unveiled during the draw for the competition. The name "Cafusa" is a syllabic abbreviation of the words "" (Carnival), "" (football) and "samba". Former Brazil captain Cafu unveiled the ball.

Cafusa was also used for the 2012 FIFA Club World Cup, the 2013 Paraguay Apertura, and the 2012–13 Venezuelan First Division.

See also
 Adidas Tango

References

External links
 Adidas ball history
 Soccerball World: History of the World Cup's Match Balls
 

Tango 12
UEFA Euro 2012
Products introduced in 2011
UEFA European Championship balls